Chicken Out may refer to: 
Chicken Out (album), a 1994 album by the Ziggens
"Chicken Out", a song by Gomez from Split the Difference